Inescapable may refer to:

Inescapable (film), 2012
Inescapable, 2003 Lesbian erotic film by Helen Lesnick
"Inescapable" (song), Jessica Mauboy 2011
"Inescapable", single by Cranes (band), 1990
Inescapable (Agents of S.H.I.E.L.D.), an episode of Agents of S.H.I.E.L.D.
Inescapable, album by Godsticks, 2020